Octineon is the sole genus of sea anemones in the monotypic family Octineonidae.

Distribution 
There are few records of this genus, but it has been reported living within the North Pacific waters, and is thought to have a much wider distribution than that. It is difficult to identify due to the fact that it's usually flat against bedrock on the sea floor.

Species
The genus contains the following species:

 Octineon chilense Carlgren, 1959
 Octineon lindahli (Carpenter in Carpenter & Jeffreys, 1871)
 Octineon suecicum Carlgren, 1940

References

Octineonidae
Hexacorallia genera